Inata is a village in Syria in the Talkalakh District, Homs Governorate. According to the Syria Central Bureau of Statistics, Inata had a population of 780 in the 2004 census. Its inhabitants are predominantly Alawites.

References

Populated places in Talkalakh District
Alawite communities in Syria